Asura arenaria is a moth of the  family Erebidae. It is found in New Guinea.

References

arenaria
Moths described in 1913
Taxa named by Walter Rothschild
Moths of New Guinea